Fabio Vittorini (born 19 December 1971) is an Italian literary critic, currently Professor of Comparative Literature at IULM University of Milan (Italy) He is known for his studies on opera and on metamodern narratives. He is the author of many books and articles.

Biography 
In 1995 he graduated in Modern Literature at University of Bologna under the supervision of Mario Lavagetto. In 1999 he got a Ph.D. in Literary Theory at University of Bergamo.

Between 1996 and 2001 he gave seminars on Literary Theory and Comparative Literature at University of Bologna. Between 2001 and 2002 he was lecturer of Italian Contemporary Literature at University of Modena and Reggio Emilia. Between 2002 and 2007 he was associate professor of Comparative Literature and Music and Image at IULM University of Milan. Since 2018 he is full professor at the same university, where he also coordinates a Master (Television, cinema and new media) and a Multimedia Laboratory, and is a member of the board of Visual and Media Studies Ph.D.

He is a member of the Italian National Council of Literary Critic and Comparative Literature.

He is a member of the steering committees of the following reviews of comparative literature: “Poli-Femo”, "Symbolon” and “Comparatismi”.

He is a member of the editorial office of the movies webzine duels.it.

He reviews musical events for the Italian newspaper Il Manifesto.

He is author and host of cultural tv shows for Italian National Television RAI.

Research Interests

Opera and Melodrama 
In his book Shakespeare and romantic opera (2000) he outlined how Shakespeare's plays entered the European continental literature and culture, mostly through French dramatic rewritings during the XVIII Century and, after the romantic consecration, through Italian operatic adaptations during the XIX Century.

In his book The Threshold of the Invisible. A Journey into Macbeth: Shakespeare, Verdi, Welles (2005), he deepened the points of the intertextual, inter-semiotic, inter-cultural and intermedial translation focusing on the case of Macbeth (Shakespeare's tragedy, Giuseppe Verdi's opera and Orson Welles's movie)

In his book Dream in Opera. Oneiric Tales and Operatic Texts (2010) he used the Freud's psychoanalysis tools to build a theory about the structural relationship between oneiric and operatic languages.

In his book Melodrama. An intermedia path between theater, novel, cinema and TV series (2020) he explored the melodramatic mode as a typically modern device of aesthetic knowledge, going back to the origins of the melodramatic imagination, mapping its deep structures and reconstructing the historical relationships between the genre where it initially crystallized (mélodrame) and the contemporary or later genres where it spread, in particular romantic opera, realist-naturalist novel, American film and television melodrama, psychoanalysis and European auteur cinema,  contemporary novel.

Narratology and Metamodernism 
In his very first book Story and Plot (1998) and in the following The Narrative Text (2005) he explored possibilities of classical narratology to define the recurring structures of narrative texts in modern, modernist and postmodernist traditions.

In 2015, after a decade of academic courses and studies, in his book USA Narrative 1984-2014: Novels, Films, Graphic Novels, TV Series, Video-games etc., he outlined the story of contemporary United States narrative fiction.

In 2017, in his book Telling today. Metamodernism between narratology, hermeneutics and intermediality, starting from the previous exploration and extending it beyond the limits of USA culture, he tried to develop a theory of the metamodern narratives.

Italo Svevo 
In 2004 he carried out the philological edition of La coscienza di Zeno and of the unfinished forth novel by Italo Svevo (Il vecchione or Il vegliardo), within The Complete Works of Italo Svevo (3 voll., Milano, Mondadori, ed. by Mario Lavagetto), which imposed itself as the basic edition for any later Svevo's critics.

In 2011 he wrote Italo Svevo, a monographic book on the author.

Bibliography

Books

 Normal People. Gender e generazioni in transito tra letteratura e media (Normal People. Genders and generations in transit between literature and media), ed. by Fabio Vittorini and Federico Bortolini, Bologna, Pàtron, 2022
 Melodramma. Un percorso intermediale tra teatro, romanzo, cinema e serie tv (Melodrama. An intermedia path between theater, novel, cinema and TV series), Bologna, Pàtron, 2020
 Nuove narrazioni mediali. Musica, immagine, racconto (New media narrations. Music, image, story), ed. by Fabio Vittorini, Bologna, Pàtron, 2019
 Raccontare oggi. Metamodernismo tra narratologia, ermeneutica e intermedialità (Telling today. Metamodernism between narratology, hermeneutics and intermediality), Bologna, Pàtron, 2017
 Narrativa USA 1984-2014: romanzi, film, graphic novel, serie tv, videogame e altro (USA Narrative 1984-2014: Novels, Films, Graphic Novels, TV Series, Video-games etc.), Bologna, Pàtron, 2015
 Italo Svevo, Milano, Mondadori, 2011
 Il sogno all'opera. Racconti onirici e testi melodrammatici (Dream in Opera. Oneiric Tales and Operatic Texts), Palermo, Sellerio, 2010
 Il testo narrativo (The Narrative Text), Roma, Carrocci, 2005
 La soglia dell'invisibile. Percorsi del Macbeth: Shakespeare, Verdi, Welles (The Threshold of the Invisible. A Journey into Macbeth: Shakespeare, Verdi, Welles), Roma, Carocci, 2005
 Italo Svevo: Guida alla "Coscienza di Zeno" (Italo Svevo: A Guidebook to "La Coscienza di Zeno"), Roma, Carocci, 2003
 Shakespeare e il melodramma romantico (Shakespeare and Romantic Opera), Firenze, La Nuova Italia, 2000
 Fabula e intreccio (Story and Plot), Firenze, La Nuova Italia, 1998

TV Programs 
2015: Spoon River Anthology (on Edgar Lee Masters' poems)

2017: Dracula (on Bram Stoker's novel and its adaptations)

2018: Edgar Allan Poe - The Last Four Days (on the life and works of the writer).

2022: The Creation of Frankenstein (on the life and works of Mary Shelley)

References

1971 births
Living people
Italian literary critics
Italian male non-fiction writers
Academic staff of the IULM University of Milan
University of Bologna alumni
University of Bergamo alumni